The N-class trams were a crossbench design of tram with a two-bogie design, each pair of benches had doors at each side.

They were attached to Dowliing Street, Newtown, Rozelle, Tempe, Ultimo, Enfield and Rockdale depots. Nine were transferred to Newcastle as steam trailers in 1915, all later returned and had their electrical equipment reinstated. The last was withdrawn in 1949.

Preservation
Three have been preserved:
710, 718, 728 at the Sydney Tramway Museum

References

Further reading

External links

Trams in Sydney
Tram vehicles of Australia